Ida, Countess of Hainaut (Ida of Louvain) (died 1139), daughter of Henry II, Count of Louvain, and Adela of Thuringa.  Ida was sister to Godfrey I, Count of Louvain.

Ida was married to Baldwin II, Count of Hainaut, who served in the First Crusade with Godfrey of Bouillon.  Ida and Baldwin had:
 Baldwin III, Count of Hainaut
 Louis (fl. 1096)
 Simon, a canon in Liege
 Henry (fl. 1096)
 Willem (d. after 1117)
 Arnould
 Ida (d. after 1101), married first Guy de Chievres and second Thomas, Lord of Coucy
 Richilde (d. after 1118), married Amaury III de Montfort, and, repudiated, became a nun at Mauberge
 Aelidis (d. 1153), married Nicolas II de Rumigny

Ida's husband, Baldwin, sold some of his property to the Bishopric of Liège in order to take the cross in the First Crusade. In 1098 he was sent to Constantinople with Hugh of Vermandois after the Siege of Antioch, to seek assistance from the Byzantine emperor. He disappeared during a raid by the Seljuk Turks in Anatolia, and was presumably killed.

While on a pilgrimage to Jerusalem in 1106, Ida organized a search for her lost husband in Anatolia but to no avail.  Ida's fate remains unknown.

Notes

Sources 

Countesses of Hainaut
11th-century births
Year of birth unknown
1139 deaths